The Whewell Professorship of International Law is a professorship in the University of Cambridge.

The Professorship was established in 1868 by the will of the 19th-century scientist and moral philosopher, William Whewell, with a view to devising "such measures as may tend to diminish the causes of war and finally to extinguish war between nations".

Incumbents of the Whewell Professorship of International Law
Holders of the Whewell chair include four judges of the International Court of Justice.

1869: Sir William Vernon Harcourt
1887: Sir Henry James Sumner Maine 
1888: John Westlake
1908: L. F. L. Oppenheim
1920: Alexander Pearce Higgins 
1935: Lord Arnold McNair
1938: Sir Hersch Lauterpacht 
1955: Sir Robert Jennings
1981: Sir Derek Bowett
1992: Prof James Crawford
From 2016: Prof Eyal Benvenisti

See also
List of Professorships at the University of Cambridge

References

 
International Law, Whewell
School of the Humanities and Social Sciences, University of Cambridge
International Law, Whewell
1868 establishments in the United Kingdom